A pastry fork, pie fork or cake fork is a fork designed for eating pastries and other desserts from a plate. The fork has three or four tines. The three-tine fork has a larger, flattened and beveled tine on the side while the four-tine fork has the first and second tine connected or bridged together and beveled.

In many fine place settings, the pastry fork and pie fork may be two separate forks as well.

It is typically designed so that it can be used with the right hand, while the left hand holds the plate. It therefore  the left side widened to be used like a knife to cut the food when pressed down on the plate. Left-handed pastry forks have the right side widened instead.

The pastry fork was invented by Francis Higgins in 1886 in London. Many believe it to have been made by Anna Mangin but her invention was used for mixing pastry dough not eating. The two inventions however share a name but not a use.  

Anna M. Mangin was awarded a patent on March 1, 1892, for a pastry fork for mixing pastry dough.

See also
 Cheese knife
 Knork
 Spork

References

Forks